Lodi Academy (LA) is a co-educational Seventh-day Adventist private school located in Lodi, California.  Lodi Academy, first known as the Western Normal Institute, opened its doors as a boarding school in 1908. Professor E. D. Sharpe served as the first President. In 1968, Lodi Academy became a day school.  Lodi Academy is part of the Northern California Conference of Seventh-day Adventist Church. It is a part of the Seventh-day Adventist education system, the world's second largest Christian school system.

Lodi Academy is recognized by the University of California as an approved college preparatory secondary school, and it is accredited by the Seventh-day Adventist Board of Regents and the Western Association of Schools and Colleges.

Academics
The required curriculum includes classes in the following subject areas: Religion, English, Oral Communications, Social Studies, Mathematics, Science, Physical Education, Health, Computer Applications, Fine Arts, and Electives.

Spiritual aspects
All students take religion classes each year that they are enrolled. These classes cover topics in biblical history and Christian and denominational doctrines. Instructors in other disciplines also begin each class period with prayer or a short devotional thought, many which encourage student input. Weekly, the entire student body gathers together in the auditorium for an hour-long chapel service.
Outside the classrooms there is year-round spiritually oriented programming that relies on student involvement.

See also

 List of Seventh-day Adventist secondary schools
 Seventh-day Adventist education

References

External links 
 

High schools in San Joaquin County, California
Educational institutions established in 1908
Adventist secondary schools in the United States
Private high schools in California
1908 establishments in California